Wu Shifan (Chinese: 吳世璠), 1663–1681, was the grandson of Wu Sangui and his successor as emperor of the Zhou dynasty during the Revolt of the Three Feudatories. He was declared the taisun (太孫, lit. 'Imperial Eldest Grandson'). He was eventually surrounded and killed by Qing forces at the last Zhou stronghold at Kunming.

References

1681 deaths
Qing dynasty rebels
Suicides in the Qing dynasty